The Mitsubishi F-2 is a multirole fighter derived from the General Dynamics F-16 Fighting Falcon, and manufactured by Mitsubishi Heavy Industries and Lockheed Martin for the Japan Air Self-Defense Force, with a 60/40 split in manufacturing between Japan and the United States. The basis of the F-2's design is the F-16 Agile Falcon, an unsuccessful offer by General Dynamics to provide a low-cost alternative for the Advanced Tactical Fighter (ATF) competition. Production started in 1996 and the first aircraft entered service in 2000. The first 76 aircraft entered service by 2008, with a total of 98 airframes produced. The first active electronically scanned array (AESA) radar on a combat aircraft was the J/APG-1 introduced on the Mitsubishi F-2 in 1995. The F-2 is nicknamed "Viper Zero", a reference to the F-16's unofficial nickname of "Viper" and the Mitsubishi A6M Zero.

Development

US–Japan negotiations
The JASDF and its contractors considered developing a Japanese-designed, Japanese-produced replacement for the aging Mitsubishi F-1 fighter as early as 1981. A formal feasibility study commenced in 1985. Japan's initial intentions to develop the aircraft domestically built upon Japan's previous success in producing the F-15J fighter under license from McDonnell Douglas. Japanese defense contractors argued that they needed to build a new aircraft from the beginning in order to develop the skill of their engineers and, in turn, develop the Japanese aircraft industry.

As the program began to take formal shape in 1985, several United States officials raised concerns that the program would result in an inferior aircraft, and would weaken the U.S.–Japan defense relationship. Pentagon officials advocated co-production or co-development of an aircraft based on the F-16 or F/A-18 platform, as they believed that Japan would not agree to buy U.S. aircraft.

In early 1987, the United States, through Caspar Weinberger and other administration officials, began formally pressuring Japan to execute the project as a U.S.–Japan bilateral joint development. The timing of this lobbying coincided with the height of "Japan bashing" in the United States: the Toshiba-Kongsberg scandal, in which Toshiba was found to have sold propeller milling machinery to the Soviet Union in violation of COCOM sanctions, became public in May 1987. Japan's negotiating stance changed amid the risk of deterioration in U.S.–Japan relations.

The Reagan administration and Nakasone government announced the joint project in October 1987. Under a memorandum of understanding signed in November 1988, General Dynamics would provide its F-16 Fighting Falcon technology to Mitsubishi Heavy Industries, and would handle up to 45 percent of the development work as a joint principal contractor.

On the American side, senior officials in the U.S. State Department and Defense Department supported the project as a means for the U.S. to access Japanese technology and as a means of strengthening U.S.–Japan relations, but the Commerce Department and many members of Congress opposed the project due to the risk of strengthening Japan's ability to compete with U.S. aerospace firms. Opponents in Congress argued that Japan should acquire American aircraft in order to offset the trade deficit between the two countries. More than twenty members of the Senate demanded official review of the deal.

After George H. W. Bush took office as president of the United States in January 1989, the U.S. government responded to domestic criticism of the deal by seeking "clarification" of the terms of the MOU, which the Japanese government viewed as an attempt to re-negotiate it. The Bush administration was particularly concerned with the risks of transferring technology to Japan. Bush announced a revised agreement in April 1989, shortly before the resignation of his Japanese counterpart Noboru Takeshita, under which Japanese access to flight control and weapons control software was limited, while the U.S. was to have access to any new technology that Japan developed for the project. American contractors were guaranteed at least 40% of the production for the program. Congress ratified the deal in June 1989 while expressing official displeasure with it.

Japanese lawmaker Shintaro Ishihara was a vocal critic of the final deal, writing in 1990 that "our Foreign Ministry and other Government agencies decided it was better to eat humble pie than incur Uncle Sam's wrath on yet another bilateral issue," and pointing out that "we give away our most advanced defense technology to the United States but pay licensing and patent fees for each piece of technology we use."

Production
Work started in the FS-X program, initially given the company designation Mitsubishi SX-3. In 1984 General Dynamics had offered an enlarged version of the F-16 to the US Air Force and considered entering it as a low cost alternative in the Advanced Tactical Fighter competition.  Neither came to fruition, however this concept became the starting point for F-2 development. The F-2 used the wing design of the F-16 Agile Falcon, but much of the electronics were further updated to 1990s standards. Japan selected the fighter to replace the F-4EJ and supplement the F-15J, its main air superiority fighter. The program involved technology transfer from the U.S. to Japan and vice versa. Responsibility for cost sharing was split 60% by Japan and 40% by the U.S. Lockheed Martin would manufacture all the aft fuselages and wing leading-edge flaps and eight of the ten left-hand wingboxes.

The F-2 program was controversial, because the unit cost, which includes development costs, is roughly four times that of a Block 50/52 F-16, which does not include development costs. Inclusion of development costs distorts the incremental unit cost (this happens with most modern military aircraft), though even at the planned procurement levels, the price per aircraft was somewhat high. The initial plan of 141 F-2s would have reduced the unit cost by up to (€7.5 million) per unit, not including reduced cost from mass production. As of 2008, 94 aircraft were planned.

The F-2's maiden flight was on 7 October 1995. Later that year, the Japanese government approved an order for 141 (but that was soon cut to 130), to enter service by 1999; structural problems resulted in service entry being delayed until 2000. Because of issues with cost-efficiency, orders for the aircraft were curtailed to 98 (including four prototypes) in 2004. Flight testing of the four prototypes were conducted by the Japan Defense Agency at Gifu Air Field.

The last of 94 production aircraft ordered under contract was delivered to the Defense Ministry on 27 September 2011.  During the roll-out ceremony of the last production F-2 fighter jet, Mitsubishi Heavy Industries confirmed that production of the F-2 would end and no more F-2 fighters will be produced by the manufacturer.  there are 61 single-seaters flying, and 21 two-seat trainers.

Design
General Electric, Kawasaki, Honeywell, Raytheon, NEC, Hazeltine, and Kokusai Electric were among the primary component sub-contractors. Lockheed Martin supplied the aft fuselage, leading-edge slats, stores management system, a large percentage of wingboxes (as part of two-way technology transfer agreements), and other components. Kawasaki built the midsection of the fuselage, as well as the doors to the main wheel and the engine, while the forward fuselage and wings were built by Mitsubishi. Some of the avionics were supplied by Lockheed Martin, and the digital fly-by-wire system was jointly developed by Japan Aviation Electric and Honeywell (formerly Allied Signal). Contractors for communication systems and IFF interrogators included: Raytheon, NEC, Hazeltine, and Kokusai Electric. The fire control radar, IRS, the mission computer, and the EW system were developed by Japan. In addition, the flight control computer, the flight control laws and related computer software were essentially all developed and integrated by Japan. Final assembly was done in Japan, by MHI at its Komaki-South facility in Nagoya.

Larger wings give an aircraft better payload and maneuverability in proportion to its thrust, but also tend to add weight to the airframe in various ways.  More weight can have negative effects on acceleration, climbing, payload, and range.  To make the larger wings lighter, the skin, spars, ribs and cap of the wings were made from graphite-epoxy composite and co-cured in an autoclave. This was the first application of co-cured technology to a production tactical fighter. This technology for the wings encountered some teething problems, but proved to be a leading-edge use of a technology that provides weight savings, improved range, and some stealth benefits. This technology was then transferred back to America, as part of the program's industrial partnership.

The F-2 has three display screens, including a liquid crystal display from Yokogawa.

Mitsubishi used the existing F-16 design as a reference guide for design work, and more than 95% of F-16 engineering drawings are changed for F-2.

Some differences in the F-2 from the F-16A:
 a 25% larger wing area
 composite materials used to reduce overall weight and radar signature
 longer and wider nose to accommodate a J/APG-1/J/APG-2 active electronically scanned array (AESA) radar. Almost simultaneously with a single squadron of USAF F-15C Eagles, the F-2 was the first operational military aircraft in the world to feature an AESA radar, before the F-22 Raptor’s AN/APG-77 AESA radar.
 larger tailplane
 larger air intake
 three-piece cockpit canopy
 Equipments and OFP related to the avionics system differ from the F-16 in many aspects.
 Original flight control system.
 capabilities for four ASM-1 or ASM-2 anti-ship missiles, four AAMs, and additional fuel tanks

Also, the F-2 is equipped with a drogue parachute, like the version of the F-16 used by South Korea, the Netherlands, Norway, Greece, Turkey, Indonesia, Taiwan, and Venezuela.

Operational history
On 7 February 2013, two Russian Air Force Sukhoi Su-27 fighters briefly entered Japanese airspace off Rishiri Island near Hokkaido, flying south over the Sea of Japan before turning back to the north. Four F-2 fighters were scrambled to visually confirm the Russian planes, warning them by radio to leave their airspace. A photo taken by a JASDF pilot of one of the two Su-27s was released by the Japan Ministry of Defense. Russia denied the incursion, saying the jets were making routine flights near the disputed Kuril Islands.

On 22 August 2013, two Russian Tupolev Tu-142 Bear-F maritime patrol aircraft entered Japanese airspace near the major southern island of Kyushu for less than two minutes.  F-2 fighters were scrambled in response.

Variants

 XF-2A: Single-seat prototypes.
 XF-2B: Two-seat prototypes.
 F-2A: Single-seat fighter version.
 F-2B: Two-seat training version.
 F-2A Super Kai: proposed variant with CFTs (conformal fuel tanks), based on the F-16C Block 60. It was intended to replace the F-4EJ Kai Phantom II. It was rejected when the F-35A Lightning II was chosen.

Operators

 Japan Air Self-Defense Force
As of March 2022, the JASDF operated 91 F-2.
Air Defense Command
 Central Air Defense Force
 7th Air Wing, Hyakuri Air Base
 3rd Tactical Fighter Squadron (2001–present)
 Western Air Defense Force
 8th Wing, Tsuiki Air Base
 6th Tactical Fighter Squadron (2004–present)
 8th Tactical Fighter Squadron (2008–present)
Air Training Command
 1st Technical School, Hamamatsu Air Base (2000–present)
 4th Air Wing, Matsushima Air Base
 21st Fighter Training Squadron (Reactivated)
Air Development and Test Command
 Air Development and Test Wing, Gifu Air Base

Accidents and incidents
 On 31 October 2007, an F-2B crashed during takeoff and subsequently caught fire at Nagoya Airfield in central Japan. The jet was being taken up on a test flight by Mitsubishi employees, after major maintenance and before being delivered to the JSDF. Both test pilots survived the incident with only minor injuries. It was eventually determined that improper wiring caused the crash.
 As a result of the 2011 Tōhoku earthquake and tsunami, 18 F-2Bs belonging to the 21st Fighter Squadron at Matsushima Air Base were damaged or destroyed. Of these 18, 5 were deemed beyond repair and have been scrapped. In the meantime, training duties carried out by the 21st Fighter Squadron have been transferred to other air bases. Repair work was completed by 2016, when the 21st Squadron returned to Matsushima.
 On 20 February 2019, an F-2B crashed during a training flight over the Sea of Japan. Both the flight instructor and pilot survived the accident.
 In April 2021, two F-2 jets (an F-2A and an F-2B) reportedly collided over Yamaguchi Prefecture.

Specifications (F-2A)

See also

References

Citations

Bibliography
 Aoki, Yoshimoto. "Mitsubishi F-2: 21st Century JASDF fighter-support". World Air Power Journal, Volume 39, Winter 1999. London:Aerospace Publishing. . ISSN 0959-7050. pp. 38–49.
 Organization ｜ [JASDF Japan Air Self-Defense Force] (accessed on February 9, 2007)
 主要装備 F-2A/B｜防衛省 [JASDF 航空自衛隊] (accessed on February 9, 2007)

External links

 JASDF Official F-2 webpage 
 F-2 at Mitsubishi Heavy Industries
 F-2 at Lockheed Martin
 F-2 at Globalsecurity.org

F-2
F-2, Mitsubishi
Single-engined jet aircraft
Japan–United States military relations
Post–Cold War military equipment of Japan
General Dynamics F-16 Fighting Falcon
Mid-wing aircraft
Aircraft first flown in 1995
Fourth-generation jet fighter